Muscarella tsubotae is a species of orchid plant native to Colombia.

References 

Pleurothallidinae
Flora of Colombia